The 2008 Sultan Azlan Shah Cup was the 17th edition of field hockey tournament the Sultan Azlan Shah Cup.

Participating nations
Seven countries participated in the tournament:

Results
All times are Malaysia Standard Time (UTC+08:00)

Preliminary round

Pool

Fixtures

Classification round

Fifth and sixth place

Third and fourth place

Final

Statistics

Final standings

Goalscorers

References

External links
Official website

2008 in field hockey
Sultan Azlan Shah Cup
2008 in Malaysian sport
2008 in New Zealand sport
2008 in Belgian sport
2008 in Canadian sports
2008 in Pakistani sport
2008 in Indian sport
2008 in Argentine sport